"I May Be Wrong (but I Think You're Wonderful)" is a popular song. The music was written by Henry Sullivan, the lyrics by Harry Ruskin. The song was published in 1929 and it was included in the musical revue Murray Anderson's Almanac which ran for 69 performances at Erlanger's Theatre on Broadway in 1929. It is said that the song was written on-demand for John Murray Anderson.

In his book, Encyclopedia of the Musical Theatre, Stanley Green reported that “because Anderson believed that the best songs are created under pressure he locked Sullivan in a room with a piano and threatened to keep him in there until he came up with a potential hit. When finally liberated, the composer had written the most successful number in the show. The song was introduced by singer Jimmy Savo in the revue."

Cover versions
High Hatters (vocal: Frank Luther) - recorded August 23, 1929 for Victor Records (catalog No. 22105).
Al Katz and His Kittens, recorded August 30, 1929 for Columbia Records, catalog No. 1971D.
Libby Holman, recorded September 1920?! for Brunswick Records, November 1929, catalog No. 4506.
Red Nichols and His Five Pennies (with vocal chorus), recorded on October 24, 1929, for Brunswick Records, catalog. No. 4500.
Gladys Rice and Franklyn Baur, recorded November 26, 1929 for Victor Records, catalog. No. 22226.
Judy Garland - performed the song on Command Performance #134, August 19, 1944.
Dinah Shore - a single release for Columbia Records, catalog No. 37140. (1946)
Frankie Laine released a version in 1946, backed by Milton Delugg and the Swing Wing for Mercury Records, catalog No. 1205A.
Doris Day with Harry James - included in the album Young Man with a Horn. Released on Columbia CL-6106 in 1950.
Frank Rosolino released a version in 1956, on his I Play Trombone album.
The Four Freshmen - for their album Four Freshmen and Five Saxes (1957).
Bing Crosby and Rosemary Clooney recorded the song in 1958 for use on their radio show and it was subsequently included in the CD Bing & Rosie - The Crosby-Clooney Radio Sessions released in 2010.
Perry Como - included in his album Saturday Night with Mr. C (1958)
The Mills Brothers - included in the album Count Basie & The Mills Brothers – The Board Of Directors (1967).
Ray Charles recorded a version for his album Volcanic Action of My Soul (1971)
June Christy - A Friendly Session, Vol. 2 (1999)
Ella Fitzgerald and Joe Pass recorded it on their album Speak Love.

Film appearances
1943 Swingtime Johnny - performed by The Andrews Sisters
1947 The Unsuspected - briefly sung by Audrey Totter
1948 Wallflower - played by the band at the dance and sung by Janis Paige
1949 You're My Everything - sung and danced by Dan Dailey
1950 Young Man with a Horn - sung by Doris Day
1951 Sunny Side of the Street - sung by Frankie Laine and Toni Arden
1953 She's Back on Broadway - performed by Gene Nelson
1961 Claudelle Inglish - played at the Senior Dance

References

1929 songs